The Solidarity Fatherland Movement  (Movimiento Patria Solidaria) is a Christian-democratic political party in Ecuador. At the 2002 legislative elections, the party won 1 seat, of a possible 100.

External links
Official web site

Christian political parties
Christianity in Ecuador
Political parties in Ecuador
Political parties with year of disestablishment missing